Aber Isle or Aber Inch is a small island in Loch Lomond, in west central Scotland. Its name derives from the Celtic word for the mouth of a river, or Gaelic eabar meaning "mud, mire".

There are some trees on it including alders and a collection of Scots pine and Hornbeam.

It is owned as part of Claddoch, north of Gartocharn.

Footnotes

Islands of Loch Lomond
Uninhabited islands of Stirling (council area)
Loch Lomond National Nature Reserve